Lost Creek Airport may refer to:

 Lost Creek Airport (Michigan) in Luzerne, Michigan, United States (FAA: 5Y4)
 Lost Creek Airport (Oregon) in Dexter, Oregon, United States (FAA: 82OR)